Espérance Sportive de Tunis is a Tunisian professional football club based in Tunis. The club was formed in Bab Souika in 1919 as Espérance sportive de Tunis, and played their first competitive match in 1919, when they entered the 1919–20 .

The club has won a total of 60 major trophies, including the national championship a record 29 times also won the Tunisian Cup a record 15 times, the Tunisian Super Cup 4 time, the CAF Champions League 4 time, the CAF Cup Winners' Cup 1 time, the CAF Cup 1 time, the CAF Super Cup 1 time, the Afro-Asian Cup 1 time, and the UAFA Club Cup 3 time. 

This is a list of the seasons played by Espérance Sportive de Tunis from 1957 when the club first entered a league competition to the most recent seasons. The club's achievements in all major national and international competitions as well as the top scorers are listed. Top scorers in bold were also top scorers of Ligue 1. The list is separated into three parts, coinciding with the three major episodes of Tunisian football:

History

Seasons overview

Season-to-season

Key 

Key to league record:
P = Played
W = Games won
D = Games drawn
L = Games lost
GF = Goals for
GA = Goals against
Pts = Points
Pos = Final position

Key to divisions:
1 = Ligue 1

Key to rounds:
DNE = Did not enter
Grp = Group stage
R1 = First Round
R2 = Second Round
R32 = Round of 32

R16 = Round of 16
QF = Quarter-finals
SF = Semi-finals
RU = Runners-up
W = Winners

Division shown in bold to indicate a change in division.
Top scorers shown in bold are players who were also top scorers in their division that season.

Honours 
As of the 2021–22 season, Espérance Sportive de Tunis have won a total of 65 titles (regional competitions not considered), of which 53 were achieved domestically and 12 in international competitions. The club's most recent honour is the 2021–22 Tunisian Ligue Professionnelle 1.

National

African

Regional

Doubles and trebles 
Doubles: (1988–89, 1990–91, 1998–99, 2005–06, 2010–11)
Trebles: (2010–11)

Footnotes
Figures include goals in League, Cup, League Cup, African competitions, and the Super Cup.

Notes

References 

 

 
Espérance Sportive de Tunis